St Peter's Pool (Official: Peter's Pool), (Maltese: Il-Bajja ta Pietru) is a small bay on the island of Malta. It is located on the North Eastern point of the Dellimara Peninsula. The bay is a common attraction among tourists looking to snorkel. A small cave can also be found on western end of the bay. As of 2022 several fences and warning signs have been put up warning the visitors of falling debris from the eroding cliffs surrounding the bay.

References 

Bays of Malta
Beaches of Malta